Coleophora namangana is a moth of the family Coleophoridae. It is found in Turkestan.

References

namangana
Moths described in 1961
Moths of Asia